Intron-encoded endonuclease I-Sce I is a homing endonuclease. The enzyme is used in biotechnology as a meganuclease. It recognises an 18-base pair sequence TAGGGATAACAGGGTAAT and leaves a 4 base pair 3' hydroxyl overhang. It is a rare cutting endonuclease. Statistically an 18-bp sequence will occur once in every 6.9*1010 base pairs (a frequency of 1 in 418). This sequence does not normally occur in a human or mouse genome.

Sources 
I-SceI is coded by introns. It is present in the mitochondria of yeast Saccharomyces cerevisiae.

References 

Molecular biology
Biotechnology
Restriction enzymes